Miss Alaska Teen USA is the pageant that selects the representative for the state of Alaska in the Miss Teen USA pageant and the name of the title held by that winner.

The pageant is part of the Miss Universe Organization which also holds the Miss USA and Miss Universe pageants. The Miss Alaska Teen USA pageant is generally held in the late fall or early winter in Anchorage, Alaska together with the Miss Alaska USA.  The current directors are former titleholders and sisters Rachel Saldana (2002) and Sonja Garness (2005).

There are three categories of competition which include Personality Interview, Swimsuit, and Evening gown. The fourth judging category is the on-stage impromptu question that is completed by the top five finalists.

Alaska has never won Miss Teen USA title, with only three teens making the semi-finals or better. However, Marla Johnson placed 1st runner-up to Bridgette Wilson of Oregon at Miss Teen USA 1990. The other two placements are recent, coming in 2003 and 2005.  Alaska has not won any special awards.

Three Alaska teens later won the Miss Alaska USA title.

Star Hunter of Anchorage was crowned Miss Alaska Teen USA 2023 on January 14, 2023 at Bartlett High School Auditorium in Anchorage. Hunter will represent Alaska at Miss Teen USA 2023.

Results summary

Placements
1st runners-up: Marla Johnson (1990)
Top 10: Brittany Jackson (2003)
Top 15: Sonja Garness (2005)
Alaska holds a record of 3 placements at Miss Teen USA.

Winners 

1 Age at the time of the Miss Teen USA pageant

References

External links
 

Annual events in Alaska
Lists of people from Alaska
Alaska
Women in Alaska